Dave Paulsen (born September 14, 1964) is an American college basketball coach who was formerly the head men's basketball coach at George Mason University in Fairfax, Virginia. He was previously the head coach at Bucknell University for seven seasons. Prior to Bucknell, he spent eight years as the head coach at his alma mater, Williams College in Williamstown, Massachusetts, and also coached at St. Lawrence University in Canton, New York, and Le Moyne College in Syracuse, New York.

Coaching career
At Williams College, Paulsen won the NCAA Division III title in 2003, and finished as national runner up in 2004.  Paulsen was twice named Division III Coach of the Year during his time at Williams.

On May 20, 2008, Paulsen was hired as head coach at Bucknell. Paulsen led the Bison to a disappointing 7–23 record in his first year at Bucknell. This constituted the school's worst winning percentage (.233) since the 1971–72 season when the Bison posted a mark of 5–18 (.217). In his second year, the Bison improved to 12–17, including a 9–5 record in Patriot League play. In his third year, Paulsen was named Patriot League Coach of the Year en route to leading his team to a 25–8 record heading into the NCAA tournament, including a 13–1 record in the Patriot League, culminating in both the regular season and Patriot League tournament championships.

During his time at Bucknell, Paulsen recruited and coached future NBA player Mike Muscala. 

On March 30, 2015, Paulsen was hired as head coach of George Mason. His team struggled in his first year, finishing the season with an overall record of 11–21, 5–13 in conference and in thirteenth place in the Atlantic 10. His second year at George Mason saw the team significantly improve, finishing 20–14 overall and 9–9 in A–10 play, and receiving an invitation to the 2017 CBI, where they would lose in the first round to Loyola (MD).

Head coaching record

References

External links
 George Mason profile

1964 births
Living people
American men's basketball coaches
American men's basketball players
Bucknell Bison men's basketball coaches
Cleveland State Vikings men's basketball coaches
College men's basketball head coaches in the United States
George Mason Patriots men's basketball coaches
Le Moyne Dolphins men's basketball coaches
Michigan Wolverines men's basketball coaches
Place of birth missing (living people)
St. Lawrence Saints men's basketball coaches
Williams Ephs men's basketball coaches
Williams Ephs men's basketball players